Shirin Bul (also Romanized as Shīrīn Būl; also known as Shīrāmbol and Shīrīn Bol) is a village in Rudpey-ye Shomali Rural District, in the Central District of Sari County, Mazandaran Province, Iran. At the 2006 census, its population was 158, in 45 families.

References 

Populated places in Sari County